Ad van 't Veer (24 February 1941 – 21 June 2021) was a Dutch music director and music group co-founder.

Van 't Veer was a main person from 1976 behind "Festival Nieuwe Muziek", a main music festival in Middelburg. He was co-founder of the music group Xenakis Ensemble. From 1984 he was director of the "Stichting Nieuwe Muziek Zeeland" (translated: New Music Zeeland Foundation), for which he remained active until his retirement.

Van 't Veer died on 21 June 2021, aged 80.

References

External links
Van 't Veer at encyclopedievanzeeland.nl

1941 births
2021 deaths
People from Goes
Date of birth missing
Place of death missing